Radomír Vašek (born 23 September 1972) is a former professional tennis player from the Czech Republic.

Career
Vašek was the Czechoslovak national Under-18s tennis champion in 1990, the same year he turned professional.

At the 1994 French Open he came into the draw as a qualifier but won his first two matches, against Younes El Aynaoui in straight sets and Dimitri Poliakov, from two sets down.

Vašek reached his first and only ATP Tour final in 1995, at the Jakarta Open. Also that year, Vašek made the quarterfinals of the Tel Aviv Open in Israel.

He was a quarterfinalist at Santiago's Movistar Open in 1997.

ATP career finals

Singles: 1 (1 runner-up)

ATP Challenger and ITF Futures finals

Singles: 9 (5–4)

Doubles: 12 (10–2)

Performance timeline

Singles

References

External links
 
 

1972 births
Living people
Czech male tennis players
Czechoslovak male tennis players
People from Valašské Meziříčí
Sportspeople from the Zlín Region